Vizzolo Predabissi is a comune (municipality) in the Metropolitan City of Milan in the Italian region Lombardy, located about  southeast of Milan.

Vizzolo Predabissi borders the following municipalities: Colturano, Dresano, Casalmaiocco, Melegnano, Cerro al Lambro, Sordio and San Zenone al Lambro.

References

External links
 Official website

Cities and towns in Lombardy